Heshik (also Romanized as Heshīk; also known as Hashak, Hashik, and Heshī) is a village in Irandegan Rural District, Irandegan District, Khash County, Sistan and Baluchestan Province, Iran. At the 2006 census, its population was 235, in 55 families.

References 

Populated places in Khash County